Global Center for Combating Extremist Ideology, also known as "Etidal", is a global center in Riyadh tasked with fighting extremism. The agreement to establish the center was announced on May 21, 2017, at a meeting between Saudi King Malik Salman bin Abdulaziz Al Saud and US President Donald Trump during the 2017 Riyadh Summit. The Riyadh-based center is governed by a 12-member Board of Directors, consisting of various international organizations and state institutions that are appointed every 5 years.

Center headquarters 

The Etidal headquarters are located in Riyadh, Saudi Arabia. The construction of the center started two years ago.

Center establishment
The agreement to establish the Global Center for Combating Extremist Ideology was made in 2017 by Saudi King Malik Salman bin Abdulaziz, and US President Donald Trump, during the 2017 Riyadh Summit. The center was established in Riyadh on May 21, 2017 and Malik Salman along with Donald Trump and other leaders of Arab and Islamic countries participated in the opening. The center will combat extremism using modern technology.

Center goals

To actively and pro-actively combat, expose, and refute extremist ideology, in cooperation with governments and organizations concerned.

Combating rational, media and statistical extremism and supporting peace and tolerance between nations.
Strengthening Islamic moderation principles in the world.
Observing and analyzing Extremist Groups ideological activities, supporting, informing and engaging in confronting extremist ideas.

References

External links 

 

Riyadh summit
Riyadh summit
Riyadh summit
Riyadh summit
Riyadh summit
Diplomatic conferences in Saudi Arabia
21st century in Riyadh